Henry Richard Greville, 3rd Earl of Warwick, 3rd Earl Brooke, KT (29 March 1779 – 10 August 1853), styled Lord Brooke from 1786 to 1816, was a British Tory politician.

Life
Warwick was the son of George Greville, 2nd Earl of Warwick, by his second wife Henrietta (née Vernon), and was educated at Winchester. Henry undertook an extensive Grand Tour between June 1801 and August 1803, his travels taking him to Copenhagen, Saint Petersburg, Moscow, Berlin, Prague, Vienna, Switzerland and throughout Italy. In March 1803 he joined Sir William Drummond and George Hamilton-Gordon, 4th Earl of Aberdeen, on Captain Sir John Gore's ship the HMS Medusa to bring Drummond to Constantinople. Henry undertook another tour to Italy during the late 1820s, where he purchased a set of Pietra Dure tables from the Grimanni Palace in Venice, a set which were sold by Merlin Entertainments at Sotheby's in 2015.

He entered Parliament as one of two representatives for Warwick in 1802, a seat he held until he succeeded his father in the earldom in 1816. He served as a Lord-in-waiting (government whip in the House of Lords) from 1841 to 1846 in the second Tory administration of Sir Robert Peel. Warwick was also a Recorder of Warwick between 1816 and 1813, Lord-Lieutenant of Warwickshire between 1822 and 1853 and a Lord of the Bedchamber between 1828 and 1830. In 1827 he was made a Knight of the Thistle.

He was also an amateur artist. His print Landscape with Old Trees by Water—one of the first lithographs made in Britain—was published in the portfolio Specimens of Polyautography in 1803.

Lord Warwick married Lady Sarah Elizabeth, daughter of John Savile, 2nd Earl of Mexborough, and widow of John Monson, 3rd Baron Monson, in 1816. She died in January 1851, aged 64. Warwick survived her by two years and died in August 1853, aged 74. He was succeeded in the earldom by his son George.

See also
Earl of Warwick
List of owners of Warwick Castle

Notes

References
Kidd, Charles, Williamson, David (editors). Debrett's Peerage and Baronetage (1990 edition). New York: St Martin's Press, 1990,

External links

1779 births
1853 deaths
Earls in the Peerage of Great Britain
Henry
Knights of the Thistle
Lord-Lieutenants of Warwickshire
Brooke, Henry Greville, Lord
People educated at Winchester College
Brooke, Henry Greville, Lord
Brooke, Henry Greville, Lord
Brooke, Henry Greville, Lord
Brooke, Henry Greville, Lord
Brooke, Henry Greville, Lord
Warwick, E3
3